The following is a list of football stadiums in Liechtenstein. The list includes total stadium capacity, not just seating capacity.

See also

     
Liechtenstein
stadiums
Football stadiums